The Dewoitine D.33 was a single-engine low-wing monoplane aircraft built by the Dewoitine Company. It is remembered for setting a long-distance record on its first flight in 1930.

Little is documented on the specifics and the basic model of the D.33, other than the fact that it had a fixed undercarriage, and was a low-wing cantilever monoplane. There were three documented variations to the model, each of which was designed as a separate aircraft. This line of aircraft were regarded highly commercially before World War II, and they were influential in the establishment of the Dewoitine Company.

Development and design
In 1929, as part of a policy of ordering prototypes to encourage technical progress by French aircraft companies, the French Air Ministry issued a specification for a long-range aircraft suitable for setting international endurance and distance records, with a large bonus to be paid if a range of 10000 km could be demonstrated. Orders were placed with Société des Avions Bernard, Blériot Aéronautique and Dewoitine.

Dewoitine's design, the D.33, was a single-engine low-wing cantilever monoplane of all metal (duralumin) construction. The wings were of high-aspect ratio for high efficiency, and of trapezoidal form with elliptical wingtips. The aircraft had a slim, streamlined fuselage, with the crew of three (pilot, navigator and radio operator) sitting in tandem in an enclosed cabin. A couch to allow crew members to rest during long flights and a toilet were also provided. The aircraft was powered by a Hispano-Suiza 12N V12 engine driving a two-bladed propeller, while a fixed tailwheel undercarriage was fitted.

D.33 Variants

D.33.01 : First prototype.
D.33.02 : Second prototype.

D.332

The D.332 was developed based on the original D.33. A single-spar cantilever low-wing monoplane, the D.332 had fundamental resemblances to the original design. Able to hold a total of eight passengers, the D.332 had a small, enclosed cockpit, with an aerodynamic design and a rigid undercarriage. It was constructed purely from metal, and was built approximately three years after the original D.33 model, in 1933.

The D.332 proved successful, ultimately achieving a best speed of over 250 km/h (155 mph), and during the initial tests, where it was flown by test pilot Marcel Doret, the D.332 prototype successfully flew from Paris to Saigon. It did, however, crash on the return flight from Saigon, on 15 January 1935.

D.333
In 1934, the D.333 was designed, built and flown for the first time. It was different from its predecessors in that it was constructed with a more spacious cabin, and could hold a maximum of 10 passengers. The primary buyer of this model was Air France; however, two of the three planes bought by the latter crashed while flying the distance between Toulouse and Dakar.

D.338

1935-6 saw the drafting and prototype of the D.338. This new model was built with retractable undercarriage, and could carry 22 passengers over a maximum of around 1,950 km (1,210 mi). Fitted with 485 kW (650 hp) Hispano-Suiza 9V16/17 engines, the D.338 could travel at a speed of up to 260 km/h (160 mph).

The D.338 was the first truly successful model in the line, and became widely used by Air France, first for flights within Europe, and later for international flights, between France and various parts of Asia. A total of 31 D.338s were purchased by Air France, and they were used into World War II, where they were employed as troop transporters. Following their use in the War, only eight aircraft survived. However, despite this, the basic model was still used for years, until more recent builds were designed.

D.342 and D.620
Dewoitine designed two one-off aircraft based on the D.33 line; the D.342 and the D.620. Very few details relating to the specifics of these two aircraft are known or documented. Both were heavily based on the D.338 in particular.

Operators

Air France

Specifications

References

Notes

Bibliography

 
 
 
 
 
 
 
The Illustrated Encyclopedia of Aircraft (Part Work 1982-1985). Orbis Publishing.

D.033
1930s French airliners
1930s French experimental aircraft
Single-engined tractor aircraft
Low-wing aircraft
Aircraft first flown in 1930